Nicole LaPointe Jameson (born April 11, 1994) is an American businesswoman currently serving as the CEO of esports organization Evil Geniuses.

Early life and career
A native of Greenwich, Connecticut, LaPointe Jameson attended Columbia University in New York City, graduating in 2016. During the summer of her junior year, she received a job offer to join Chicago-based investment firm PEAK6. She worked with several distressed asset businesses for five years before coming across Evil Geniuses, which she described as a "diamond in the rough." PEAK6 would later acquire Evil Geniuses in May 2019, installing LaPointe Jameson as the organization's new CEO. This made her the first African American woman to lead a major esports organization. In September 2019, the organization made their return to League of Legends and Counter-Strike: Global Offensive, securing a franchise slot in the League of Legends Championship Series, along with acquiring NRG Esports' CS:GO roster. The organization also doubled their staff count and opened new offices in Seattle and Los Angeles within a year of LaPointe Jameson's tenure.

LaPointe Jameson was featured in the 2020 Forbes 30 Under 30 under the games category.

In January 2021, Evil Geniuses became the first major esports team to sign a mixed-gender squad for Valorant. In a tweet, LaPointe Jameson stated, "I don’t care where you come from. Nor your creed, gender, religion, class, past industry, or sexual orientation. If you are the best of the best, you have a home here at Evil Geniuses."

References

1994 births
Living people
Columbia College (New York) alumni
American people in the video game industry
American women chief executives
African-American businesspeople
Esports businesspeople
Esports executives and administrators
Video game businesspeople
Women in esports
Women in the video game industry
People from Connecticut
21st-century African-American people
21st-century African-American women